Ochrotrigona triangulifera is a moth of the family Erebidae first described by George Hampson in 1895. It is found in Sikkim, Thailand, Vietnam, Peninsular Malaysia and on Borneo and Sumatra.

References

Moths described in 1895
Calpinae